Soda Springs (also, Soda Spring and Singleys Soda Spring) is a spring in Mendocino County, California.

References

Reference bibliography 

Unincorporated communities in California
Unincorporated communities in Mendocino County, California